Joan Poh (born 14 April 1991) is a Singaporean rower. She competed in the 2020 Summer Olympics.

Poh studied nursing at Nanyang Polytechnic and National University of Singapore and works as a nurse in the renal unit of Tan Tock Seng Hospital.

Poh had represented Singapore at the 2011 Southeast Asian Games in dragon-boating but did not win any medals. She subsequently picked up rowing just before the 2015 Southeast Asian Games and represented Singapore in the 1,000m women’s coxless pair with Joanna Chan where they won the bronze medal.

References

External links
 

1991 births
Living people
Rowers at the 2020 Summer Olympics
Singaporean female rowers
Olympic rowers of Singapore
Rowers at the 2018 Asian Games
Asian Games competitors for Singapore
Singaporean female sailors (sport)
Dragon boat racers at the 2010 Asian Games
21st-century Singaporean women